Kutwal Lake is a high-altitude lake located in the Haramosh valley of Gilgit district, in Gilgit-Baltistan, Pakistan. The valley of Haramosh is about 60 miles to the east of the district capital, Gilgit. The lake is surrounded by several high mountains, including Haramosh Peak, Laila Peak and Dobani Peak.

References

Lakes of Gilgit-Baltistan